Port Allen Airport  is a regional airport of the State of Hawai'i. Most flights to Port Allen Airport originate from commuter airports on the other Hawaiian islands by unscheduled air taxis and general aviation.

It is included in the Federal Aviation Administration (FAA) National Plan of Integrated Airport Systems for 2017–2021, in which it is categorized as a general aviation facility.

History
The 1928 the Territorial legislature allotted $15,000 to establish an airport on Kauai, and purchased land at its present site. The first flight from Port Allen Airport, by Inter-Island Airways, was in November 1929.

Facilities and aircraft 

The airport has separate parking areas for fixed wing aircraft and helicopters and a public parking area. There are no other public facilities at the airport.  Access to the airport is provided by Kaalani Road, which connects the airport with Lolokai Road and Highway 50. Adjacent to the airport are the salt ponds at Hanapepe where paakai is prepared. The principal planned improvements are the development of helicopter lease lots to the eastern end of the airport, construction of public comfort stations and minor roadway improvements.

For the 12-month period ending December 31, 2008, the airport had 5,535 aircraft operations, an average of 15 per day: 59% air taxi, 40% general aviation, and 1% military. At that time there were 10 aircraft based at this airport: 40% helicopter, 10% glider and 50% ultralight.

Authority 
Port Allen Airport is part of a centralized state structure governing all of the airports and seaports of Hawaii. The official authority of Port Allen Airport is the Governor of Hawaii. The governor appoints the Director of the Hawai'i State Department of Transportation who has jurisdiction over the Hawaii Airports Administrator.

The Hawai'i Airports Administrator oversees six governing bodies: Airports Operations Office, Airports Planning Office, Engineering Branch, Information Technology Office, Staff Services Office, Visitor Information Program Office. Collectively, the six bodies have authority over the four airport districts in Hawai'i: Hawai'i District, Kauai District, Mau'i District and the principal O'ahu District. Port Allen Airport is a subordinate of the Kauai District officials.

References

External links 
 Port Allen Airport (PAK) at Hawaii DOT
 

Airports in Hawaii
Transportation in Kauai County, Hawaii
Buildings and structures in Kauai County, Hawaii
Airports established in 1929
1929 establishments in Hawaii